Studia Iranica is a biannual peer-reviewed academic journal covering Iranian and Persianate history, literature, and society published by Peeters Publishers on behalf of the Association for the Advancement of Iranian Studies. The editors-in-chief are Marcel Bazin (University of Reims Champagne-Ardenne) and Rémy Boucharlat (University of Lyon). Articles are published in English or French and cover a period ranging from the proto-historical to the modern period, while its geographic boundaries coincide with those of the area where ancient Iranian or modern Iranian languages were or are spoken.

Abstracting and indexing
The journal is abstracted and indexed in:

References

External links
 

Iranian studies journals
Historiography of Iran
Publications established in 1989
Academic journals associated with learned and professional societies
Peeters Publishers academic journals
Biannual journals
Multilingual journals